Eugenia indica is a species of plant in the family Myrtaceae. It is endemic to India.

References

Endemic flora of India (region)
indica
Endangered plants
Taxonomy articles created by Polbot